College of Fine Arts, Bangalore is a fine arts college located at Bangalore, Karnataka. It was established in the year 1983. 
This college offers different undergraduate and postgraduate courses in fine arts.

Courses

Painting
Sculpture
Graphic Art
Applied Art
Art History
Animation
Visual Art

Accreditation
The college is recognized by the University Grants Commission (UGC).

References

External links
http://collegeoffineartskcpbengaluru.com/

Educational institutions established in 1983
1983 establishments in Karnataka
Colleges affiliated to Bangalore University
Colleges in Bangalore